Obluchye is a town and the administrative center of Obluchensky District in the Jewish Autonomous Oblast, Russia, located on the Khingan River,  west of Birobidzhan, the administrative center of the autonomous oblast. Population:

History
Construction on a section of the Trans-Siberian Railway connecting Chita and Vladivostok began in 1898, starting at each end and meeting halfway. The project produced a large influx of new settlers and in 1911 a village was founded around the Obluchye railway station, the name of which roughly means the route passing around as the railway at this point travels through a large curve around the mountains.

The railway was completed in October 1916.

Town status was granted to Obluchye in 1938.

Administrative and municipal status
Within the framework of administrative divisions, Obluchye serves as the administrative center of Obluchensky District, to which it is directly subordinated. As a municipal division, the town of Obluchye, together with five rural localities in Obluchensky District, is incorporated within Obluchensky Municipal District as Obluchenskoye Urban Settlement.

Economy
The gold mining company Zoloto Zutary is based in the town. Other employers include the railway workshops connected to the town's station on the Trans-Siberian Railway.

References

Notes

Sources

Cities and towns in the Jewish Autonomous Oblast
Populated places established in 1911
1911 establishments in the Russian Empire
Amur Oblast (Russian Empire)